Lanzhou is the lead ship of the Chinese Type 052C destroyers (NATO code name Luyang II class). The ship was laid down in late 2002, launched on 29 April 2003, and commissioned in July 2004. The destroyer is active with the People's Republic of China's  South Sea Fleet.

History 
The ship began construction in June 2001 and was launched in April 2003. She began service in August 2005.

On 23 April 2009, Lanzhou, as one of the new equipment of the People's Liberation Army Navy (PLA Navy), participated in the maritime military parade of the 60th anniversary of the establishment of the Chinese PLA Navy in the Yellow Sea near Qingdao, Shandong Province. In late May 2009, Lanzhou, the Type 071 amphibious transport dock , Type 903 replenishment ship Qinghai Hu and Chao Hu, and other special mixed formations conducted a 17-day long-distance mobile combat drill in the South China Sea. The drill set the three records of the longest three-way replenishment time, the largest single ship replenishment, and the largest dry basket replenishment in the PLA Navy.

On 30 June 2010, Lanzhou and Kunlun Shan departed Zhanjiang, Guangdong to relieve the fifth Escort Task Group for the anti-piracy operations in Gulf of Aden and Somalia; the two ships along with the replenishment ship Weishan Hu formed the sixth task group. On 14 July 2010, the two task groups met in the western side of the gulf. The escort mission lasted 192 days and ended in January 2011. She escorted 31 batches of 365 ships of various types and visited Saudi Arabia, Sri Lanka, and Indonesia.

In May 2014, the China National Offshore Oil Corporation drilling platform Offshore Oil 981 was drilling in the disputed Paracel Islands. Due to the disturbance of Vietnamese vessels, Lanzhou was dispatched along with China Coast Guard cutters to confront the Vietnamese vessels and guard the drilling platform.

On 30 September 2018, the US Navy's   passed through the waters adjacent to Nanxun Reef in the disputed waters of the South China Sea, and was intercepted by Lanzhou.

References

External links 
 Sinodefence.com

Lanzhou
2003 ships